The 2017 Copa do Brasil Fourth Round was played from 12 April to 19 April 2017, to decide the 5 teams advancing to the Round of 16. In this year, each tie was played on a home-and-away two-legged basis. If tied on aggregate, the away goals rule would be used. If still tied, extra time would not be played, and the penalty shoot-out would be used to determine the winner.

Draw
A draw for the fourth round was held by CBF on March 17, 2017. The 10 qualified teams were in a single group.

2017 CBF ranking shown in brackets.

Matches

|}

Match 71

Tied 3–3 on aggregate, Sport won on penalties and advanced to the round of 16.

Match 72

Paraná won 2–0 on aggregate and advanced to the round of 16.

Match 73

Fluminense won 4–2 on aggregate and advanced to the round of 16.

Match 74

Tied 2–2 on aggregate, Internacional won on penalties and advanced to the round of 16.

Match 75

Cruzeiro won 3–2 on aggregate and advanced to the round of 16.

References

2017 Copa do Brasil